Graham James may refer to:

Graham James (bishop) (born 1951), retired British Anglican bishop
Graham James (ice hockey) (born 1952), former Canadian ice hockey coach and convicted sex offender